Physeter is a genus of toothed whales. There is only one living species in this genus: the sperm whale (Physeter macrocephalus). Some extremely poorly known fossil species have also been assigned to the same genus including Physeter antiquus (5.3–2.6 mya) from the Pliocene of France, and Physeter vetus (2.6 mya – 12 ka) from the Quaternary of the U.S. state of Georgia. Physeter vetus is very likely an invalid species, as the few teeth that were used to identify this species appear to be identical to those of another toothed whale, Orycterocetus quadratidens.

References

Sperm whales
Cetacean genera
Mammal genera with one living species
Taxa named by Carl Linnaeus